Shunzō, Shunzo or Shunzou (written: 春三 or 俊三) is a masculine Japanese given name. Notable people with the name include:

, Japanese footballer
, Japanese writer
, Japanese politician

Japanese masculine given names